Dorson Boyce (born June 25, 1988) is currently a retired American fullback. He was signed by the Seattle Seahawks as an undrafted free agent in 2011. He played college football at the University of Washington. He was also a member of the Washington Redskins.

Professional career

Seattle Seahawks
Boyce was signed by the Seattle Seahawks as an undrafted free agent following the end of the NFL lockout in 2011. He was waived on August 16, 2011, but re-signed on August 18.

Washington Redskins
Boyce signed with the Washington Redskins on July 25, 2012. He was waived-injured on August 31, 2012.  After clearing waivers, he was officially added to the injured reserve list on September 3.

He was released on June 13, 2013.

References

External links
 Washington Huskies bio

1988 births
Living people
People from New York City
American football fullbacks
Washington Huskies football players
Seattle Seahawks players
Washington Redskins players